is an airport in Kunisaki, Ōita, Japan,  northeast of Ōita.

The airport is accessible by bus but not by train. Hovercraft service to Oita was available until 2009, the last hovercraft service to operate in Japan.

This airport is classified as hub/first class airport.

As of 2021, Virgin Orbit plans to use Oita Airport for its launch site.

Airlines and destinations

Statistics

References

Airports in Kyushu
Transport in Ōita Prefecture
Buildings and structures in Ōita Prefecture